Lacquer thinner, also known as cellulose thinner, is usually a mixture of solvents able to dissolve a number of different resins or plastics used in modern lacquer.

Previously, lacquer thinners frequently contained alkyl esters like butyl or amyl acetate, ketones like acetone or methyl ethyl ketone, aromatic hydrocarbons like toluene, ethers such as glycol cellosolves, and/or alcohols.

Modern lacquer thinners increasingly have to comply with low-VOC regulations.  These formulations are often mostly acetone with small quantities of aromatic solvent.

Paints that dry by simple solvent evaporation and contain solid binders insolvent (solvent) are known as lacquers. When the solvent in lacquer paints evaporates, a solid layer remains. Since this layer can be dissolved again with the solvent, each lacquer can dissolve the one below it.

See also
 Paint thinner

References 

Solvents